Delimara Tower, originally known as Torre della Limara, was a small watchtower on the Delimara Peninsula, in the limits of Marsaxlokk, Malta. It was built in 1659 as the tenth De Redin tower, and an artillery battery was later built nearby in 1793. Both the tower and the battery have been demolished.

History
Delimara Tower was built in 1659 at the tip of Delimara Point. It followed the standard design of the De Redin towers, having a square plan with two floors and a turret on the roof. A feature unique to Delimara Tower was that it had machicolations. It also had a buttress at the base, implying that it had some structural weaknesses. A similar buttress still exists at Triq il-Wiesgħa Tower.

Delimara Tower had Xrobb l-Għaġin Tower in its line of sight to the northeast, and Bengħisa Tower to the southwest. A mortar battery was built near the tower in 1793.

Both the tower and battery were demolished by the British to clear the line of fire of the nearby Fort Delimara.

References

De Redin towers
Batteries in Malta
Towers completed in 1659
Buildings and structures completed in 1793
Demolished buildings and structures in Malta
Marsaxlokk
Former towers
1659 establishments in Malta